Poplar Blackwall and District Rowing Club is a rowing club in Millwall, on the River Thames in England, on the northern bank of the Thames opposite Greenwich on the Isle of Dogs, London.

Club history
Poplar Blackwall and District Rowing Club was founded in 1854 and is one of the oldest rowing clubs in Great Britain. It was established by a group of young lightermen as "The Blackwall Rowing and Athletic Club". Boats were carried to the river from a local pub.

After World War I there was an increase in membership from shipwrights, boilermakers and stevedores from the nearby shipyards and docks, although the depression in the 1930s led to reduced activity again.

The club reformed with its present name in 1935 and established a club and boat house on the present site in 1937: "the boys themselves constructed a launching ramp at Calder's Wharf", using North Greenwich railway station as a shelter for the boats.

In 1964 the club became aware of Greenwich Council’s plans to buy the existing site at Calders Wharf, which up until that point had been privately leased to the club, and relocate them to the South side of the river. The then club president, Dorothea (Dolly) Woodward Fisher O.B.E. negotiated with the council to reach agreement that they fund construction of a new building themselves under the council’s proviso that a gymnasium be provided and the club, "…should cater for the poor boys and men of Poplar, Blackwall, Stepney and surrounding Districts".

An appeal was launched to raise £75,000 for construction. Club president Mrs Woodward Fisher, who also ran a prominent lighterage business together with her late husband W. J. Woodward-Fisher, in Limehouse, took the helm in securing funds, "Mrs Fisher was wonderful and got all sorts of people on board. Ex Mayor of London Lord Rothchilds, Lord Cottesloe and many charities to help our cause."

Architects Forrest and Barber were commissioned to design the new club house, completed in 1970. The building has a strong modernist aesthetic, particularly visibly when seen from the South side of the river, characteristic of the architects’ previous projects which include the Harrison Gibson furniture showroom in Ilford, East London.

Activities
The club provides rowing and sculling for adult, adult beginner, junior, masters (mature categories).  It has events for recreational and competitive sides of the sport.

The club house marks the finish of the annual Great River Race.
  
Taking the period since 2000 alone, PBDRC has seen members win more than 10 regattas and winter head races.  The club has, at the top level, produced and enhanced international oarsmen and oarswomen: a few members of the club have represented Great Britain in the Olympic Games and World Championships in this period.

Competition history
In 1995 and 1996, juniors from the club (in a composite quad with the Windsor Boys' School) won the Fawley Challenge Cup at Henley Regatta.

In 2011, Ralph Humphrey and Robert Milligan's double won the World Masters in Poznan, Poland, the Britain Masters and the Henley Masters Veterans.

British champions

See also
Rowing on the River Thames

References

External links
 http://www.pbdrc.co.uk/ official website

Sports clubs established in 1854
Tideway Rowing clubs
1854 establishments in England
Millwall
Rowing clubs of the River Thames